Prashant Vashist (born 15 September 1998) is an Indian cricketer. He made his first-class debut for Haryana in the 2018–19 Ranji Trophy on 20 November 2018.

References

External links
 

1998 births
Living people
Indian cricketers
Haryana cricketers
Place of birth missing (living people)